Chwihui of Geumgwan Gaya (died 451) (r. 421–451) was the seventh ruler of Geumgwan Gaya, a Gaya state of ancient Korea. He was the son of King Jwaji and Queen Boksu.

Family
Father: King Jwaji (좌지왕, 坐知王)
Mother: Lady Boksu (복수부인, 福壽夫人)
Wife: Lady Indeok (인덕부인, 仁德夫人) – daughter of a gakgan named Jinsa (진사, 進思).
Son: King Jilji (질지왕, 銍知王)

See also 
 List of Korean monarchs
 History of Korea
 Gaya confederacy
 Three Kingdoms of Korea

Notes

References 

Gaya rulers
451 deaths
5th-century monarchs in Asia
Year of birth unknown